Terestrombus is a genus of sea snails, marine gastropod mollusks in the family Strombidae, the true conchs.

Species
Species within the genus Terestrombus include:
Terestrombus afrobellatus (Abbott, 1960)
Terestrombus fragilis (Röding, 1798)
Terestrombus terebellatus (Sowerby II, 1842)

References

Strombidae